Isabella Gamez (born February 1, 1999) is a Filipino-American pair skater who competes for the Philippines with her partner Alexander Korovin. Gamez and Korovin are currently competing in their first season together for the 2022-2023 figure skating season after two years of training. Gamez and Korovin achieved a historical milestone for the Philippines, taking home the first-ever medal for Philippine pairs skating in an international competition, a silver medal at the Trophée Métropole Nice Côte d’Azur in Nice, France. Korovin/Gamez also earned the technical minimums to become the first Southeast Asian and Philippine pairs team to qualify for the 2023 World Figure Skating Championships in Saitama, Japan. 

With her former skating partner, David-Alexandre Paradis, Isabella competed in the final segment at the 2020 Four Continents Championships. They were the first figure skating pairs team to represent the Philippines in international competitions.

Competing for Spain with her former skating partner, Tòn Cónsul, she is the 2018 Spanish Junior National champion and finished 13th at the 2018 World Junior Championships.

Personal life 
Gamez was born on February 1, 1999, in Cape Coral, Florida. She is a dual citizen of the Philippines and the United States. Both her parents are Philippine-born with Spanish heritage. She grew up regularly spending time in Manila, maintaining a close tie to her Philippine heritage and family living there.

Career

Early career 
Gamez began skating in 2005 in Florida. She started as a singles skater before switching to pairs. Gamez teamed up with Griffin Schwab in pairs from the 2015–16 season. They earned the novice silver medal in their first season at the 2016 U.S. Championships. Gamez/Schwab finished ninth in juniors at the 2017 U.S. Championships before splitting.

2017–2018 season 
Gamez teamed up with Spanish skater Tòn Cónsul to represent Spain. They competed at two Junior Grand Prix events, finishing 11th in Zagreb and 13th in Gdańsk. Gamez/Cónsul then won the 2018 Spanish junior national title and the 2018 Mentor Toruń Cup. They ended the season with a 13th-place finish at the 2018 World Junior Championships.

Gamez/Cónsul split after he left skating at the end of the season. Gamez did not have a partner for the 2018–19 season.

2019–2020 season 
Gamez began representing the Philippines in a new pair with Canadian skater David-Alexandre Paradis. Gamez/Paradis competed at three Challenger Series events, becoming the first Filipino and Southeast Asian pair to compete in an International Skating Union competition. They then finished seventh at Volvo Open Cup. Gamez/Paradis also earned the technical minimums for the 2020 Four Continents Championships to become the first Filipino and Southeast Asian pair to compete at an ISU Championship. They finished ninth at Four Continents. Gamez/Paradis concluded their season with an 11th-place finish at the Challenge Cup.

Gamez and Paradis split due to travel restrictions and inability to train together during the COVID-19 pandemic. Paradis retired from pairs skating to focus on his coaching career.

2020–2021 and 2021–2022 seasons 
In August 2021, the Philippine Skating Union announced that Gamez had teamed up with Russian skater Alexander Korovin to represent the Philippines. They met and began training together in early 2021. For the 2021–2022 season, Gamez and Korovin focused on their training at Hertz Arena with Coach Marina Zoueva and her team in Estero, Florida.

2022-2023 season 
The Gamez/Korovin pair made their debut at the 2022 CS Finlandia Trophy, where they placed ninth after two years of inactivity.  The pair shared before their international debut, Hurricane Ian devastated Southwest Florida affecting their training venue and practice schedule a week before Finland. In their second competition together, Gamez and Korovin achieved a historical milestone for the Philippines. They won the first-ever medal for Philippine pairs skating in an international competition, a silver medal at the Trophée Métropole Nice Côte d’Azur in Nice, France. They competed at the 2022 CS Warsaw Cup placing 11th, and withdrew from the Golden Spin of Zagreb due to injury. Gamez/Korovin continued the season to become the first Senior Pairs team to win Philippine Figure Skating Championships bringing awareness to the pairs discipline in the tropical country as the only competitors in December 2022. They qualified and competed at the 2023 Four Continents Championships in Colorado Springs placing ninth. Following the Challenge Cup in Tilburg, Netherlands, Korovin/Gamez earned the technical minimums to become the first Southeast Asian and Philippine pairs team to qualify for the 2023 World Figure Skating Championships in Saitama, Japan.

Programs

With Korovin

With Paradis

With Cónsul

With Schwab

Competitive highlights 
CS: Challenger Series; JGP: Junior Grand Prix. Pewter medals (4th place) awarded only at U.S. national, sectional, and regional events.

With Korovin for the Philippines

With Paradis for the Philippines

With Cónsul for Spain

With Schwab for the United States

Ladies' singles for the United States

Detailed results 
Small medals for short and free programs awarded only at ISU Championships. ISU Personal best in bold.

With Korovin

With Paradis

References

External links 
 
 
 

1999 births
Living people
American female single skaters
American female pair skaters
Spanish female pair skaters
Filipino female pair skaters
People from Cape Coral, Florida
21st-century American women
20th-century American women